Jøssund is a village in Ørland municipality in Trøndelag county, Norway. The village of Jøssund is home to the Jøssund Church. The village was the administrative centre of the old municipality of Jøssund from 1896 until 1964.

References

Ørland
Villages in Trøndelag